is the 4th major single by the Japanese girl idol group S/mileage. It was released in Japan on February 9, 2011 on the label Hachama.

The physical CD single debuted at number 6 in the Oricon daily singles chart.

In the Oricon weekly chart, it debuted at number 5.

B-sides 
The B-side of the regular edition was a cover of the song "Otome Pasta ni Kandō" by a Morning Musume subgroup called Tanpopo that released it as a single in 2000.

Release 
The single was released in five versions: four limited editions (Limited Editions A, B, C, and  D) and a regular edition.

All the limited editions came with a sealed-in serial-numbered entry card for the lottery to win a ticket to one of the single's launch events.

Personnel 
S/mileage members: 
 Ayaka Wada
 Yūka Maeda
 Kanon Fukuda
 Saki Ogawa

Track listing

Regular Edition

Limited Editions A, B, C, D

Charts

References

External links 
 Profile of the CD single on the official website of Hello! Project

2011 singles
Japanese-language songs
Angerme songs
Songs written by Tsunku
Song recordings produced by Tsunku
2011 songs